= Whangarei Observatory =

Observatory in Whangārei, New Zealand

Coordinates: 35.74150°S 174.26845°E

Whangarei Observatory is associated with the Northland Astronomical Society (NAS), and situated in the Heritage Park grounds, off State Highway 14 in Maunu, Whangārei, New Zealand.

An all weather Planetarium is available for public, school and group tours. Public tours run every Saturday evening at 7 pm from February to November. The observatory is available after all tours and to society members when weather conditions allow viewing.
